Dmitry Donskoy, also known as The Battle of Kulikovo was the first opera written by Anton Rubinstein. It has three acts and a libretto by Count Vladimir Sollogub and Vladimir Zotov, based on a drama by Vladislav Ozerov. First performed in 1852, the opera, apart from its overture, is now lost.

Background
Rubinstein asked for a libretto from Sollogub, who had also worked on Glinka's successful opera A Life for the Tsar, on what was ostensibly also a nationalist theme, the success of Dmitry Donskoy at the Battle of Kulikovo (1380) against the commander of the Tatar Golden Horde, Mamai. However he ignored the historic elements in favour of a fairly routine operatic love story.

The overture was completed first and was performed at a concert in 1850. But Rubinstein faced trouble with the Russian censors, who forbade any stage presentation of Donskoy himself singing. Eventually the score was approved in 1851, and the first performance took place on 30 April 1852 at the Bolshoi Kamenny Theatre in St. Petersburg. The censors however insisted that the title be rendered as The Battle of Kulikovo. Rubinstein wrote to his mother 'This is not so terrible. The public will gradually find out what the real names are'. The composer was pleased by the reception, although he complained about the quality of the singers: nonetheless he reported that 'The success was enthusiastic!'  However the opera had only four performances and does not seem to have been revived. Only the score of the overture has survived, together with one aria and some vocal parts in archives in St. Petersburg.

Synopsis
Donskoy wins the hand of Ksenia over his rival Tverskoy when he leads the victory over Mamai in the Battle of Kulikovo.

Roles

References
Notes

Sources
Philip S. Taylor, Anton Rubinstein, A Life in Music, Indianapolis, 2007.

Operas
1852 operas
Russian-language operas
Operas by Anton Rubinstein
Lost operas
Operas set in Russia
Operas set in the 14th century
Operas based on real people
Cultural depictions of Russian monarchs
Cultural depictions of military officers